|-
| Gabela
| Čapljina
| Herzegovina-Neretva Canton
|-
| Gaćice
| Vitez
| Central Bosnia Canton
|-
| Gaj
| Goražde
| Bosnian Podrinje Canton
|-
| Gaj
| Uskoplje
| Central Bosnia Canton
|-
| Gajevi
| Ilijaš
| Sarajevo Canton
|-
| Gajine
| Ilijaš
| Sarajevo Canton
|-
| Gakići
| Konjic
| Herzegovina-Neretva Canton
|-
| Galečić
| Tomislavgrad
| Canton 10
|-
| Galičica
| Uskoplje
| Central Bosnia Canton
|-
| Galjevo
| Konjic
| Herzegovina-Neretva Canton
|-
| Garačići
| Bugojno
| Central Bosnia Canton
|-
| Garež
| Vogošća
| Sarajevo Canton
|-
| Garovci
| Hadžići
| Sarajevo Canton
|-
| Gladnik,
| Travnik
| Central Bosnia Canton
|-
| Glamoč
| Glamoč
| Canton 10
|-
| Glamoč
| Goražde
| Bosnian Podrinje Canton
|-
| Glavatičevo
| Konjic
| Herzegovina-Neretva Canton
|-
| Glavica
| Glamoč
| Canton 10
|-
| Glavice
| Bugojno
| Central Bosnia Canton
|-
| Glavska
| Ravno
| Herzegovina-Neretva Canton
|-
| Glodnica
| Jablanica
| Herzegovina-Neretva Canton
|-
| Glogošnica
| Jablanica
| Herzegovina-Neretva Canton
|-
| Gluha Bukovica
| Travnik
| Central Bosnia Canton
|-
| Gnjilišta
| Čapljina
| Herzegovina-Neretva Canton
|-
| Gobelovina
| Konjic
| Herzegovina-Neretva Canton
|-
| Gočela
| Goražde
| Bosnian Podrinje Canton
|-
| Godinja
| Trnovo
| Sarajevo Canton
|-
| Gojanovići
| Ilijaš
| Sarajevo Canton
|-
| Gojčevići
| Goražde
| Bosnian Podrinje Canton
|-
| Goleš
| Travnik
| Central Bosnia Canton
|-
| Golinjevo
| Livno
| Canton 10
|-
| Golo Brdo
| Bugojno
| Central Bosnia Canton
|-
| Golubinac
| Ravno
| Herzegovina-Neretva Canton
|-
| Gora
| Vogošća
| Sarajevo Canton
|-
| Gorani
| Konjic
| Herzegovina-Neretva Canton
|-
| Goransko Polje
| Konjic
| Herzegovina-Neretva Canton
|-
| Goravci
| Kupres
| Canton 10
|-
| Goražde
| Goražde
| Bosnian Podrinje Canton
|-
| Gorica
| Čapljina
| Herzegovina-Neretva Canton
|-
| Gorica
| Grude
| West Herzegovina Canton
|-
| Gorica
| Konjic
| Herzegovina-Neretva Canton
|-
| Gornja Bioča
| Hadžići
| Sarajevo Canton
|-
| Gornja Bioča
| Ilijaš
| Sarajevo Canton
|-
| Blatnica
| Čitluk
| 
|-
| Gornja Brda
| Goražde
| Bosnian Podrinje Canton
|-
| Gornja Britvica
| Široki Brijeg
| West Herzegovina Canton
|-
| Gornja Bukvica
| Goražde
| Bosnian Podrinje Canton
|-
| Gornja Misoča
| Ilijaš
| Sarajevo Canton
|-
| Gornja Presjenica
| Trnovo
| Sarajevo Canton
|-
| Gornja Prisika
| Tomislavgrad
| Canton 10
|-
| Gornja Raštelica
| Hadžići
| Sarajevo Canton
|-
| Gornja Ričica
| Uskoplje
| Central Bosnia Canton
|-
| Gornja Trebeuša
| Travnik
| Central Bosnia Canton
|-
| Gornja Večeriska
| Vitez
| Central Bosnia Canton
|-
| Gornja Vratna Gora
| Konjic
| Herzegovina-Neretva Canton
|-
| Gornje Krčevine
| 
| 
|-
| Gornje Mladice
| Ilidža
| Sarajevo Canton
|-
| Gornje Paprasko
| Jablanica
| Herzegovina-Neretva Canton
|-
| Gornje Peulje
| Bosansko Grahovo
| Canton 10
|-
| Gornje Ravno
| Kupres
| Canton 10
|-
| Gornje Višnjevice
| Konjic
| Herzegovina-Neretva Canton
|-
| Gornje Vukovsko
| Kupres
| Canton 10
|-
| Gornji Boganovci
| Bugojno
| Central Bosnia Canton
|-
| Gornji Bogovići
| Goražde
| Bosnian Podrinje Canton
|-
| Gornji Brišnik
| Tomislavgrad
| Canton 10
|-
| Gornji Crnač
| Široki Brijeg
| West Herzegovina Canton
|-
| Gornji Čažanj
| Konjic
| Herzegovina-Neretva Canton
|-
| Gornji Čevljanovići
| Ilijaš
| Sarajevo Canton
|-
| Gornji Gradac
| Konjic
| Herzegovina-Neretva Canton
|-
| Gornji Gradac
| Široki Brijeg
| West Herzegovina Canton
|-
| Gornji Kazanci
| Bosansko Grahovo
| Canton 10
|-
| Gornji Korićani
| Travnik
| Canton 10
|-
| Gornji Kovačići
| Novo Sarajevo
| Canton 10
|-
| Gornji Malovan
| Kupres
| Canton 10
|-
| Gornji Mamići
| Široki Brijeg
| West Herzegovina Canton
|-
| Gornji Mračaj
| Uskoplje
| Central Bosnia Canton
|-
| Gornji Nevizdraci
| Konjic
| Herzegovina-Neretva Canton
|-
| Gornji Rujani
| Livno
| Canton 10
|-
| Gornji Tiškovac
| Drvar
| Canton 10
|-
| Gornji Velešići
| Novo Sarajevo
| Sarajevo Canton
|-
| Gornji Zovik
| Hadžići
| Sarajevo Canton
|-
| Gorogaše
| Ravno
| Herzegovina-Neretva Canton
|-
| Goruša
| Bugojno
| Central Bosnia Canton
|-
| Gostovići
| Konjic
| Herzegovina-Neretva Canton
|-
| Govedovići
| Trnovo
| Sarajevo Canton
|-
| Grab
| Ljubuški
| West Herzegovina Canton
|-
| Grabova Draga
| Široki Brijeg
| West Herzegovina Canton
|-
| Grabovci
| Konjic
| Herzegovina-Neretva Canton
|-
| Grabovica
| Tomislavgrad
| Canton 10
|-
| Grabovik
| Goražde
| Bosnian Podrinje Canton
|-
| Grabovnik
| Ljubuški
| West Herzegovina Canton
|-
| Grabovina
| Čapljina
| Herzegovina-Neretva Canton
|-
| Gračanica
| Bugojno
| Central Bosnia Canton
|-
| Gračanica
| Trnovo
| Sarajevo Canton
|-
| Gradac
| Goražde
| Bosnian Podrinje Canton	
|-
| Gradac
| Hadžići
| 
|-
| Gradac
| Posušje
| West Herzegovina Canton
|-
| Gradačac
| Gradačac
| Tuzla Canton
|-
| Gradeljina
| Konjic
| Herzegovina-Neretva Canton
|-
| Gradina
| Travnik
| Central Bosnia Canton
|-
| Gradnići
| Čitluk
| Herzegovina-Neretva Canton
|-
| Gradska
| Ljubuški
| West Herzegovina Canton
|-
| Grahovčići
| Travnik
| Central Bosnia Canton
|-
| Grahovik
| Travnik
| Central Bosnia Canton
|-
| Grahovište
| Vogošća
| Sarajevo Canton
|-
| Grbavica I
| Novo Sarajevo
| Sarajevo Canton
|-
| Grbavica II
| Novo Sarajevo
| Sarajevo Canton
|-
| Grborezi
| Livno
| Canton 10
|-
| Grebci
| Ravno
| Herzegovina-Neretva Canton
|-
| Greda
| Ljubuški
| 
|-
| Gredine
| Bugojno
| Central Bosnia Canton
|-
| Grgići
| Bugojno
| Central Bosnia Canton
|-
| Grivići
| Hadžići
| Sarajevo Canton
|-
| Grljevići
| 
|
|-
| Grgurići
| Livno
| Canton 10
|-
| Grkovci
| Bosansko Grahovo
| Canton 10
|-
| Grnica
| Uskoplje
| Central Bosnia Canton
|-
| Gruborski Naslon
| Drvar
| Canton 10
|-
| Grude
| Grude
| West Herzegovina Canton
|-
| Grude
| Hadžići
| Sarajevo Canton
|-
| Grušča
| Konjic
| Herzegovina-Neretva Canton
|-
| Gubin
| Livno
| Canton 10
|-
| Guča Gora
| Travnik
| 
|-
| Gunjačići
| Goražde
| Bosnian Podrinje Canton
|-
| Gunjevići
| Goražde
| Bosnian Podrinje Canton
|-
| Gusići
| Goražde
| Bosnian Podrinje Canton
|-
| Guskovići
| Goražde
| Bosnian Podrinje Canton
|}

Lists of settlements in the Federation of Bosnia and Herzegovina (A-Ž)